Slave of Love could refer to the following:
 Aido: Slave of Love, 1969 Japanese film 
 A Slave of Love, 1976 Russian film
 Slave to Love, 1985 Bryan Ferry song
 Slave of Love, 2014 Armenian TV series